Wraxall is a civil parish in the English county of Dorset, consisting of the two hamlets Higher Wraxall and Lower Wraxall. Dorset County Council's 2013 mid-year estimate of the parish population is 40.

The origin of the name Wraxall, shared with several other villages in Somerset, Wiltshire and Dorset, is thought to be "a nook of land frequented by buzzards".

St Mary's Church is the most noticeable building in the parish.

References

External links

Villages in Dorset